Pathlaag is a 1964 Indian Marathi-language thriller film produced and directed by Raja Paranjape. It is an adaptation of the novel Asha Parat Yete written by Jayant Deokule. The film stars Kashinath Ghanekar and Bhavana. It was a commercial success, and won the National Film Award for Best Feature Film in Marathi. The film was later remade in Tamil as Idhaya Kamalam (1965) and in Hindi as Mera Saaya (1966).

Plot 
When Balasaheb Panse, a renowned Indian lawyer goes abroad, he receives a telegram informing him of the sudden death of his wife Asha. After she has been cremated and he is still in mourning, a woman arrested as a member of a criminal gang by the police claims to be Asha. She keeps telling Panse intimate details about their lives, expresses surprise that anyone could have thought her dead and implores him to have her released, causing a major emotional dilemma for Panse. Eventually, the second woman is revealed as indeed his wife, while the woman who died was her hitherto unmentioned twin sister.

Cast 
 Kashinath Ghanekar as Balasaheb Panse
 Bhavana as Asha and Nisha/Raina

Production 
Pathlaag is based on Jayant Deokule's novel Asha Parat Yete. It was produced and directed by Raja Paranjape under Shripad Chitra, and the screenplay was written by G. D. Madgulkar. The cinematography was handled by Datta Gorle. Kashinath Ghanekar and Bhavana made their acting debuts with this film.

Soundtrack 
The music was composed by Datta Davjekar, and screenwriter Madgulkar also served as lyricist. There are only two songs in the film: "Ya Dolyanchi Don Pakhare" and "Nako Marus Hak", both sung by Asha Bhosle. The former attained popularity.

Release and reception 
Pathlaag became a commercial success, and won the National Film Award for Best Feature Film in Marathi. The film was later remade in Tamil as Idhaya Kamalam (1965) and in Hindi as Mera Saaya (1966). Despite its success, Pathlaag failed to set a trend of more detective films being made in Marathi.

References

Bibliography

External links 
 

1960s Marathi-language films
1960s thriller films
1964 films
Best Marathi Feature Film National Film Award winners
Films based on Indian novels
Indian thriller films
Marathi films remade in other languages
Twins in Indian films